NBC Columbus can refer to:

WCMH-TV, the NBC television affiliate in Columbus, Ohio.
WLTZ, the NBC television affiliate in Columbus, Georgia.